Henri Maurice Peyre (21 February 1901 – 9 December 1988) was a French-born American linguist, literary scholar and Sterling Professor of French Emeritus at Yale University.

Peyre graduated from the École Normale Superieure and the Sorbonne and received his PhD from the Universite de Paris. In 1925 he started teaching at Bryn Mawr College, ten miles west of Philadelphia. From 1933 to 1938 he was professor of French literature at the Egyptian University in Cairo, and from 1938 to 1969 he was Sterling Professor of French at Yale University. Upon mandatory retirement at age 68 from Yale in 1969 to his retirement in 1980, he was Distinguished Professor at the City University of New York Graduate Center.

In 1930 Peyre was awarded a Guggenheim Fellowship. He was elected to the American Philosophical Society in 1953. In 1954 he received a grant from the American Council of Learned Societies to do research for his next book. He was elected to the American Academy of Arts and Sciences in 1957 and, in 1963, he was a member of the National Commission on the Humanities. In France he was made officer of the Légion d'Honneur.

Publications 
Peyre wrote about 30 books about classicism, modern literature, and higher education. A selection:
 1955. The contemporary French novel
 1962. Essays on English and American literature With Leo Spitzer, and A. Hatcher.
 1963. Literature and sincerity
 1967. French Novelists of Today. New York: Oxford UP, 
 1968. Jean-Paul Sartre
 2005. Henri Peyre: His Life in Letters. With John W. Kneller and Mario Maurin eds. 
Articles, a selection
 1953. "Exile by Saint-John Perse", Shenandoah, Lexington, vol. V, Winter 1953
 1964. "André Malraux and the Arts " The Baltimore Museum of Art: Baltimore, Maryland, 1964

See also
André Malraux

References

External links 
 
 Henri Peyre – Obituary, 1988

1901 births
1988 deaths
Linguists from the United States
University of Paris alumni
Bryn Mawr College faculty
Yale University faculty
Yale Sterling Professors
20th-century linguists
French emigrants to the United States
Presidents of the Modern Language Association
Members of the American Philosophical Society